Van der Goes or van der Goes is a surname of Flemish-Dutch origin. Notable people with this name include:

Adriaen van der Goes (c.1505–1560), Dutch Grand pensionary
Aert van der Goes (1475–1545), Dutch Grand Pensionary
Freddie van der Goes (1908–1976), South African freestyle swimmer
Hugo van der Goes (c. 1430/1440 – 1482), Flemish painter
Marinus Robyn van der Goes (1599/1606 – 1639), Flemish engraver
Philips van der Goes (1651–1707), Dutch naval officer
Wouter van der Goes (born 1973), Dutch radio DJ

Surnames of Dutch origin